Glee: The Music, The Graduation Album is the twelfth soundtrack album by the cast of the American musical television series Glee. It was released by Columbia Records on May 15, 2012. The album features eight songs recorded for the third-season finale, "Goodbye", only five of which were performed in the episode.

Track listing
Unless otherwise indicated, Information is based on Liner notes

Personnel
Unless otherwise indicated, Information is taken from the album’s Liner notes

Dianna Agron – lead vocals (1-2, 4)
Adam Anders – music arranger, vocal arranger, digital editing, producer, soundtrack producer, additional background vocals
Alex Anders - engineer, digital editing, additional vocal producer, additional background vocals 
Nikki Anders - additional background vocals 
Peer Åström – music arranger, producer, engineer, mixing
Kala Balch - additional background vocals 
Emily Benford - additional background vocals 
Joshua Blanchard - assistant engineer 
RaVaughn Brown - additional background vocals 
Geoff Bywater – executive in charge of music
Deyder Cintron - assistant engineer, digital editing, additional background vocals 
Chris Colfer – lead vocals (4, 7)
Kamari Copeland - additional background vocals 
Darren Criss – lead vocals
Tim Davis - vocal contractor, additional background vocals 
Tommy Denander - guitars
Dante Di Loreto – executive producer
Henrik Edenhed - mixing 
Luke Edgemon - additional background vocals 
Brad Falchuk – executive producer

Ryan Gillmor - assistant engineer 
Missi Hale - additional background vocals 
Fredrik Jansson - assistant engineer 
Storm Lee - additional background vocals 
David Loucks - additional background vocals 
Lea Michele – lead vocals (1, 3-4, 6, 8, 10, 13)
Cory Monteith – lead vocals (1, 4, 8-11, 13)
Matthew Morrison – lead vocals (12)
Ryan Murphy – producer, soundtrack producer
Jeanette Olsson - additional background vocals 
Chord Overstreet – lead vocals (1, 8, 13)
Tiffany Palmer - additional background vocals 
Martin Persson - music programming 
Ryan Petersen – assistant engineer
Zac Poor - additional background vocals 
Nicole Ray - production coordinator 
Amber Riley – lead vocals (1-2, 8, 13)
Naya Rivera – lead vocals (1-2, 4)
Mark Salling – lead vocals (4-5, 11)
Drew Ryan Scott - additional background vocals 
Onitsha Shaw - additional background vocals 
Jenna Ushkowitz – lead vocals (2)
Windy Wagner - additional background vocals 
Joe Wohlmuth - assistant engineer

Charts

References

2012 soundtrack albums
Columbia Records soundtracks
Glee (TV series) albums